Moon is a first-person shooter video game developed by Renegade Kid for the Nintendo DS. The game was originally set to be shipped in North America on November 18, 2008, but the developer later pushed back the release to January 13, 2009. It was also released on June 3, 2009 in Europe.

The game's publishing rights were originally owned by Mastiff Games in the United States following a five-year agreement. In January 2014, it was announced the agreement had since expired, consequently giving Renegade Kid back complete ownership of the title, including publishing rights, and paving way for a potential sequel in development. On January 24, 2014, Renegade Kid unveiled an episodic Nintendo 3DS remake/expansion titled Moon Chronicles.

Gameplay

Moon features first-person shooter gameplay and full 3D environments that the player can explore. Over the course of the game, the player can collect a variety of weapons to fight enemies. The game has three difficulty modes and is presented in multiple episodes with checkpoints scattered throughout each one. The upper screen of the DS displays the player's view of the environment, while the lower screen displays menu commands and a real-time map. The game's story will be revealed as the player progresses through each level with pre-rendered cutscenes, text logs accessible through computer terminals, and communications with the player character's superiors. Much of the fighting the player experiences takes place in narrow corridors, although the developer has mentioned that the updated game engine allows for wide-open environments and large groups of enemies. The game does not feature any multiplayer mode, with the focus of the game being the single-player campaign.

While the gameplay is mostly action-oriented, several puzzles are included to challenge the player. Some of these puzzles involve the player taking control of a small robotic drone to travel through vents and tunnels to unlock doors. The drone is armed with a stun gun that can temporarily incapacitate enemies, as well as deactivate shields that block the player's progress throughout the game.

During gameplay, the player can accumulate a maximum of seven different weapons, not including the drone. Weapons can be selected using the touch screen, and gameplay is automatically paused during weapon selection. Aiming is also accomplished on the touch screen, with movement assigned to the D-pad or buttons, depending on the player's settings.

Plot
In Moon, the year is 2058 and the United States has established a series of stations on the Moon to perform scientific experiments and construct a Mars launch facility. An extraordinary discovery has been uncovered at one of the dig sites, a sealed hatch leading beneath the Moon's surface. The player assumes the role of Major Kane, the leader of a special task force sent to investigate the mysterious hatch and reveal its secrets.

The player controls Major Kane, who is en route to a Moon base, where several mysterious hatches are uncovered. Upon Arrival, Kane has a brief conference with General Lambert. Alpha Team's helmet feed is seen on the secondary Monitors, when a burst of energy knocks out communications, and kills the members of Alpha team. En route to the hatch, Kane comes across a mysterious canister filled with a blue liquid, which he unknowingly inhales, and loses consciousness. Hours later, Kane awakens to find his vitals the same as a world class athlete.
Kane proceeds to the hatch, and finds crates of canisters identical to the one he found, earlier. After Kane destroys the boss, the core is set to self-destruct. Kane escapes in the nick of time, only to find the Moon base overrun with sentries. Kane then secures the garage, and heads to the next hatch, via a Moon rover, referred to as the Lola-RR10. in this next hatch, he finds the shocking truth about the canisters: they contain human organ extracts. Disgusted, he leaves, only to be abducted by a spaceship. Kane then must fight his way off, destroying the ship in the process. A mysterious frequency is found, apparently friendly, helps Kane navigate through the maze of a lab. Kane then gets access to a shuttle, which takes him to an urbanized Saturn. Kane then fights his way to the supreme commander, which levels the aliens' civilization. The game ends with Kane warping back to Earth, followed by three enemy spaceships.

Development
Since Moon utilizes an updated version of the Renegade Engine included in Renegade Kid's previous game, Dementium: The Ward, the game features a frame rate of 60 frames per second and high-quality 3D visuals, along with stylus-based controls. Renegade Kid has focused on "high-action gameplay challenges" to test the player's skills; these challenges include varying the placement of enemies in the game and providing them with unexpected behaviors. The exploration aspects of the game were designed to "reward" a player with access to new areas among other things.

A jump mechanic was considered for the game, but was ultimately never implemented in order to focus on shooting gameplay. According to the developer, this "would have divided our gameplay focus in order to present the player with interesting ways of utilizing the jump so it didn't feel like an afterthought and may have diluted the overall experience. Focusing on one thing and trying to make it good is usually the best thing to do rather than do many things only to an OK quality."

Reception

Moon received "average" reviews according to the review aggregation website Metacritic. It was also acclaimed for its graphics and frame rate but criticized for its lack of multiplayer.

Nintendo 3DS remake

On January 24, 2014, Renegade Kid unveiled Moon Chronicles for the Nintendo 3DS. It is an episodic remake of Moon, and is set to expand the story even further. The base game was released as Moon Chronicles: Episode 1: One Small Step for $8.99 on the Nintendo eShop on May 15, 2014 in North America only. Episode 2, Episode 3, and Episode 4 have been released as DLC for $4.50 each on the eShop, or $9.00 for all three. Episode 1, 2, 3, and 4 make up the first Season of Moon Chronicles episodes. They also make up the actual remade content from the original Moon. The game is not released in Europe still at end of 2017.

References

External links

2009 video games
Episodic video games
First-person shooters
Science fiction video games
Nintendo DS games
Nintendo 3DS eShop games
Video games developed in the United States
Video games set in the 2050s
Video games set on the Moon
Mastiff (company) games
Single-player video games